"The Age of the World Picture" or "The Age of the World View" is a 1938 lecture by Martin Heidegger in which he addresses the metaphysical ground of modern science.
It was published in the essay collection Holzwege in 1950.

English translations
The essay has been translated as "The Age of the World Image" by Marjorie Grene (1951) 
and as "The Age of the World Picture" by William Lovitt (1977) and Julian Young (2002).

Critique
Sidonie Kellerer believes that Heidegger published the text to show his “inner resistance” after the mid-1930s against the Nazi regime and as evidence for his early refusal of National Socialism and his rejection of a modern ideology that resulted in the totalitarian system. Emphasizing the differences between the published text and the original lecture delivered in 1938, she thinks that the differences show "the artful falsifications" used by Heidegger in order to re-establish his reputation.

References

External links
The Age of the World Picture: Hermeneutics and the Weltanschauung Theory
The Age of the World-Picture is a Fine Thirty-Two (at the Time of Writing)
The Age of the World Picture
Paranoia in the Age of the World Picture: The Global "Limits of Enlightenment"

1938 in philosophy
1950 in philosophy
Works by Martin Heidegger
Criticism of science
Metaphysics literature
1938 speeches
Philosophy lectures